The following is a summary of the electoral history of Rand Paul, United States Senator from Kentucky (2011–present).

United States Senate election (2010)
Paul successfully won both the Republican nomination and the junior Senate seat for Kentucky during the 2010 Senate election.

Republican primary for the United States Senate from Kentucky, 2010

 Rand Paul - 206,986 (58.8%)
 Trey Grayson - 124,864 (35.4%)
 Bill Johnson - 7,861 (2.2%)
 John Stephenson - 6,885 (2.0%)
 Gurley L. Martin - 2,850 (0.8%)
 Jon J. Scribner - 2,829 (0.8%)

United States Senate election in Kentucky, 2010

 Rand Paul - 755,216 (55.74%)
 Jack Conway - 599,617 (44.26%)
 Billy Ray Wilson - 338 (0.02%)

United States Senate election (2016)
Paul retained both the Republican nomination and the junior Senate seat for Kentucky during the 2016 Senate election.

Republican primary for the United States Senate from Kentucky, 2016

 Rand Paul - 169,180 (84.79%)
 James Gould - 16,611 (8.33%)
 Stephen Howard Slaughter - 13,728 (6.88%)

United States Senate election in Kentucky, 2016

 Rand Paul - 1,090,177 (57.27%)
 Jim Gray - 813,246 (42.72%)
 Others - 42 (0.00%)

Presidential primaries (2016)

Iowa Republican caucuses, 2016

 Ted Cruz - 51,666 (27.64%)
 Donald Trump - 45,427 (24.30%)
 Marco Rubio - 43,165 (23.12%)
 Ben Carson - 17,395 (9.30%)
 Rand Paul - 8,481 (4.54%)
 Jeb Bush - 5,238 (2.80%)
 Carly Fiorina - 3,485 (1.86%)
 John Kasich - 3,474 (1.86%)
 Mike Huckabee - 3,345 (1.79%)
 Chris Christie - 3,284 (1.76%)
 Rick Santorum - 1,783 (0.95%)
 Others - 117 (0.06%)
 Jim Gilmore - 12 (0.01%)

Paul suspended his campaign on February 3, 2016, two days following the Iowa caucus. Despite this, he continued to get write-in votes in other contests.

Republican Party presidential primaries, 2016

 Donald Trump - 14,015,993 (44.95%)
 Ted Cruz - 7,822,100 (25.08%)
 John Kasich - 4,290,448 (13.76%)
 Marco Rubio - 3,515,576 (11.27%)
 Ben Carson - 857,039 (2.75%)
 Jeb Bush - 286,694 (0.92%)
 Others - 144,454 (0.46%)
 Rand Paul - 66,788 (0.21%)
 Chris Christie - 57,637 (0.18%)
 Mike Huckabee - 51,450 (0.16%)
 Carly Fiorina - 40,666 (0.13%)
 Jim Gilmore - 18,369 (0.06%)
 Rick Santorum - 16,627 (0.05%)

References

External links
Official website, Presidential campaign
Official website, U.S. Senate campaign

Rand Paul
Paul, Rand